was a town located in Watarai District, Mie Prefecture, Japan.

As of 2003, the town had an estimated population of 7,440 and a density of 55.92 persons per km². The total area was 133.04 km².

On October 1, 2005, Nantō, along with the town of Nansei (also from Watarai District), was merged to create the town of Minamiise and thus no longer exists as an independent municipality.

External links
 Official website of Minamiise 

Dissolved municipalities of Mie Prefecture